Małgorzata Wojtyra (born 21 September 1989) is a Polish track cyclist. At the 2012 Summer Olympics, she competed in the Women's Omnium, finishing in 11th place overall.

Career results

2008
3rd Scratch Race, International Track Challenge Vienna
2009
International Track Challenge Vienna
1st Points Race
1st Scratch Race
2nd Scratch Race, UEC European U23 Track Championships
2010
UEC European U23 Track Championships 
2nd Omnium, UEC European U23 Track Championships
2nd Team Pursuit (with Renata Dąbrowska and Katarzyna Pawłowska)
2011
UEC European U23 Track Championships
1st Omnium
2nd Scratch Race
2nd Team Pursuit (with Eugenia Alickun and Katarzyna Pawłowska)
 3rd Team Sprint (with Natalia Rutkowska)
2013
Grand Prix of Poland
2nd Omnium
3rd Points Race
2014
Panevėžys
1st Points Race
3rd Omnium
3rd Scratch Race
1st Omnium, GP Prostějov – Memorial of Otmar Malecek
Grand Prix of Poland
2nd Points Race
3rd Scratch Race
Grand Prix Galichyna
2nd Points Race
3rd Omnium
2015
International Belgian Open
1st Individual Pursuit
2nd Scratch Race
3rd Points Race
1st Omnium, Six Days of Ghent
2nd Omnium, Open des Nations sur Piste de Roubaix
3rd Scratch Race, Grand Prix of Poland
2016
1st Team Pursuit, Grand Prix of Poland (with Edyta Jasińska, Katarzyna Pawłowska and Natalia Rutkowska)
2nd Scratch Race, Fenioux Piste International
3rd Points Race, Revolution Series, Round 6 – Manchester

References

External links

Polish female cyclists
1989 births
Living people
Olympic cyclists of Poland
Cyclists at the 2012 Summer Olympics
Cyclists at the 2016 Summer Olympics
Polish track cyclists
Sportspeople from Szczecin
21st-century Polish women